The Scuderia Cameron Glickenhaus SCG Boot is a mid-size off-road vehicle produced by Scuderia Cameron Glickenhaus from 2020.

History
The Boot was developed by SCG, which also specializes in competing in the 24 Hours of Le Mans races and producing supercars. The benchmark was the Hurst Baja Boot off-road racing car, which was raced by Steve McQueen in the late 1960s. Following on from this vehicle, the SCG Boot gained distinctive proportions with clearly defined wheel arches, wide-tread off-road tires and quadruple round headlamps set back in line with the windshield.

The Boot was built in two body variants: shorter, two-door and two-seater, as well as an elongated, four-door and four-seater, which gives access to the rear row of seats through the so-called suicide doors. The Boot is equipped with both a 4-speed automatic transmission and a 4.2-liter V8 engine developed by the American automaker General Motors. The unit comes from the pony car Chevrolet Camaro and works with permanent four-wheel drive, which allows for easy driving in off-road conditions.

References

All-wheel-drive vehicles
Boot
Cars introduced in 2020